6255 Kuma, provisional designation , is a carbonaceous asteroid from the central region of the asteroid belt, approximately 22 kilometers in diameter. It was discovered on 5 December 1994, by Japanese astronomer Akimasa Nakamura at Kuma Kogen Astronomical Observatory on the Island of Shikoku, Japan. It was named after the Japanese town of Kumakōgen.

Classification and orbit 

Kuma is a dark asteroid that orbits the Sun in the central main-belt at a distance of 2.7–2.8 AU once every 4 years and 6 months (1,658 days). Its orbit has an eccentricity of 0.03 and an inclination of 5° with respect to the ecliptic. The first precovery was taken at Crimea–Nauchnij in 1975, extending the asteroid's observation arc by 19 years prior to its discovery.

Physical characteristics 

Kuma is an assumed carbonaceous C-type asteroid.

Rotation period 

In September 2006, a rotational lightcurve of Kuma was obtained from photometric observations by American astronomer Brian Warner at the Palmer Divide Observatory in Colorado. Lightcurve analysis gave a rotation period of  hours with a brightness amplitude of 0.15 magnitude.

Diameter and albedo 

According to the space-based surveys carried out by the Infrared Astronomical Satellite IRAS, the Japanese Akari satellite, and NASA's Wide-field Infrared Survey Explorer with its NEOWISE mission, Kuma measures between 15.53 and 22.72 kilometers in diameter, and its surface has a low albedo in the range of 0.029 to 0.06.

The Collaborative Asteroid Lightcurve Link derives an even lower albedo of 0.02 and a diameter of 22.7 kilometers using an absolute magnitude of 12.9.

Naming 

This minor planet was named after the Japanese rural town Kuma (now Kumakōgen, Ehime), home of the discovering observatory that was built in 1992 for astronomical education and tourism. Kuma is located on the Japanese island of Shikoku, after which the minor planet 4223 Shikoku is named. The town supports local cultural activities and is a significant destination for pilgrims. The approved naming citation was published by the Minor Planet Center on 14 May 1995.

Notes

References

External links 
  
 Asteroid Lightcurve Database (LCDB), query form (info )
 Dictionary of Minor Planet Names, Google books
 Asteroids and comets rotation curves, CdR – Observatoire de Genève, Raoul Behrend
 Discovery Circumstances: Numbered Minor Planets (5001)-(10000) – Minor Planet Center
 
 

006255
Discoveries by Akimasa Nakamura
Named minor planets
19941205